Tamarind (Tamarindus indica) is a species of tree and the fruit from that tree.

Tamarind may also refer to:

 Diploglottis australis, or native tamarind, a rainforest tree of Eastern Australia
 Garcinia gummi-gutta, or Malabar tamarind, native to Indonesia
 Garcinia atroviridis, a rainforest tree native to Peninsular Malaysia
 Dialium cochinchinense, or velvet tamarind, native to southeast Asia
 Dialium guineense, or velvet tamarind, native to Africa
 Dialium indum, or tamarind-plum, native to south and southeast Asia

See also
 Tamarindo (disambiguation), the Spanish name for tamarind